Abu Razard Kamara (born 1 April 1997) is a Liberian professional footballer who plays as a forward for Malaysia Super League club Kedah Darul Aman and the Liberia national team.

Club career
In March 2014, Kamara began his senior career with Liberian first division club Ganta Black Stars.

In 2016, he signed for the Lao Premier League team CSC Champa.

In February 2022, Kamara joins Malaysian Premier League team Kuching City F.C. In May, he scored 
a hattrick for Kuching City F.C. on a goal-scoring spree as they trashed Selangor F.C. II 5-1 in their Premier League match at Petaling Jaya City Council Stadium.

International career
He made his debut for the Liberia national football team on 3 September 2021 in a World Cup qualifier against Nigeria, a 0–2 away loss. He substituted Terrence Tisdell in the 57th minute.

References

External links

1997 births
Living people
Sportspeople from Monrovia
Liberian footballers
Liberia international footballers
Association football forwards
KF Feronikeli players
NK Rudar Velenje players
Slovenian PrvaLiga players
Football Superleague of Kosovo players
Liberian expatriate footballers
Liberian expatriate sportspeople in Laos
Liberian expatriate sportspeople in Kosovo
Liberian expatriate sportspeople in Slovenia
Expatriate footballers in Laos
Expatriate footballers in Kosovo
Expatriate footballers in Slovenia